Qin Hao is a Chinese actor. He is known for starring in the 2009 film Spring Fever and the 2020 television series The Bad Kids.

Early life
In 1996, Qin entered China's Central Academy of Drama. He graduated from the Central Academy of Drama in 2000.

Career
Qin landed his first lead role in Lou Ye's Spring Fever, which was shown in competition at the 62nd Cannes Film Festival where it won the prize for best screenplay.

He married the famous singer Annie Yi, and they have a daughter named Cindy (b.2016).

Filmography

Film

Television series

Awards

References

External links 

  Qin Hao at Mtime.com

21st-century Chinese male actors
Living people
Male actors from Shenyang
Central Academy of Drama alumni
1978 births
Chinese male film actors
Chinese male television actors